The following outline is provided as an overview of and topical guide to auto racing:

Auto racing – motorsport involving the racing of cars for competition. Also known as automobile racing or car racing.

What type of thing is auto racing? 

Auto racing can be described as all of the following:

 A sport
 A motorsport
 A racing sport

Types of auto racing 

 Formula racing
 Touring car racing
 Sports car racing
 Production car racing
 One-make racing
 Stock car racing
 Rallying
 Rallycross
 Off-road racing
 Drag racing
 Kart racing
 Historical racing
 Shortcar
 Other

History of auto racing 

History of auto racing

 Motorsport industry
 Driver deaths in motorsport
 Driver and co-driver deaths in rallying events

Rules and procedures of auto racing 

 Did Not Finish
 Homologation
 Hot lap
 Pacenotes
 Pole position
 Racing flags
 Rolling start
 Safety car
 Standing start

Facilities and equipment of auto racing 

 Race track
 Chicane
 Hairpin turn
 Run-off area
 Special stage

Participants in auto racing 

 Teams and drivers
 Co-driver
 Driver development program
 Factory-backed
 Pay driver
 Privateer
 Test driver
 Team orders

Science of auto racing 

 Vehicle dynamics
 Handbrake turn
 Racing line
 Grip (auto racing)
 Understeer and oversteer
 Racing setup
 Automotive aerodynamics
 Downforce
 Drafting
 Ground effect in cars
 Spoiler (car)

Auto racing organizations 

 Fédération Internationale de l'Automobile
 Fédération Internationale du Sport Automobile
 Confederation of Australian Motor Sport
 Deutscher Motor Sport Bund
 Fédération Française du Sport Automobile
 Automobile Club de l'Ouest
 Motor Sports Association
 NASCAR
 INDYCAR
 International Motor Sports Association
 Sports Car Club of America

Auto racing competitions 

 Formula racing

 Formula One
 Grand Prix motor racing
 Formula E
 Super Formula
 IndyCar Series
 Formula 2
 Formula 3000
 Formula 5000
 Formula 3
 Formula 4

 Sports car racing

 FIA World Endurance Championship
 FIA GT Championship
 World Sportscar Championship
 IMSA SportsCar Championship
 American Le Mans Series (defunct; one of the predecessors to today's WeatherTech SportsCar Championship)
 Rolex Sports Car Series (defunct; one of the predecessors to today's WeatherTech SportsCar Championship)
 IMSA GT Championship
 Can-Am
 European Le Mans Series
 WeatherTech SportsCar Championship
 Blancpain GT Series
 Super GT

 Touring car racing

 World Touring Car Championship
 European Touring Car Championship
 British Touring Car Championship
 Deutsche Tourenwagen Masters
 Stock Car Brasil
 Supercars Championship
 Turismo Carretera
 TC 2000 Championship

 Rallying

 World Rally Championship
 European Rally Championship
 FIA World Rallycross Championship
 FIA Cross-Country Rally World Cup
 Global Rallycross Championship

 Other

 Karting World Championship
 NASCAR series:
 NASCAR Cup Series
 NASCAR Xfinity Series
 NASCAR Camping World Truck Series
 ARCA Racing Series
 NASCAR Pinty's Series (Canada)
 NASCAR PEAK Mexico Series
 NASCAR Whelen Euro Series
 NHRA Mello Yello Drag Racing Series

Auto racing publications 
 Television
 Motorsport.tv
 Speed
 List of Formula One broadcasters
 List of Indianapolis 500 broadcasters
 NASCAR on television and radio
 Radio
 Indianapolis Motor Speedway Radio Network
 Motor Racing Network
 Performance Racing Network
 Radio Le Mans
 Print
 Autosport
 GP Racing
 Racer

Persons influential in auto racing 

 Drivers

 Formula One
 Sebastian Vettel
 Lewis Hamilton
 Kimi Räikkönen
 Fernando Alonso
 Mika Häkkinen
 Damon Hill
 Michael Schumacher
 Nigel Mansell
 Ayrton Senna
 Alain Prost
 Nelson Piquet
 Niki Lauda
 Emerson Fittipaldi
 Jackie Stewart
 Jim Clark
 Jack Brabham
 Graham Hill
 Alberto Ascari
 John Surtees
 Juan Manuel Fangio
 Stirling Moss
 Giuseppe Farina
 Tazio Nuvolari
 Bernd Rosemeyer
 NASCAR
 Bobby Allison
 Kyle Busch
 Dale Earnhardt
 Jeff Gordon
 Kevin Harvick
 Jimmie Johnson
 David Pearson
 Lee Petty
 Richard Petty
 Tony Stewart
 Rusty Wallace
 Darrell Waltrip
 Cale Yarborough
 Rallying
 Sébastien Loeb
 Marcus Grönholm
 Carlos Sainz
 Colin McRae
 Tommi Mäkinen
 Juha Kankkunen
 Didier Auriol
 Markku Alén
 Hannu Mikkola
 Massimo Biasion
 Björn Waldegård
 Walter Röhrl
 Mikko Hirvonen
 Petter Solberg
 Stig Blomqvist
 Ari Vatanen
 Michèle Mouton
 Stéphane Peterhansel
 Jean-Louis Schlesser
 IndyCar
 Mario Andretti
 Michael Andretti
 Hélio Castroneves
 Scott Dixon
 A. J. Foyt
 Dario Franchitti
 Rick Mears
 Bobby Rahal
 Johnny Rutherford
 Al Unser
 Al Unser Jr.
 Bobby Unser
 Alex Zanardi
 Sports cars
 Derek Bell
 Frank Biela
 Rinaldo Capello
 Yannick Dalmas
 Romain Dumas
 Jacky Ickx
 Tom Kristensen
 Allan McNish
 Henri Pescarolo
 Emanuele Pirro
 Hans-Joachim Stuck
 Rolf Stommelen
 Eric van de Poele
 Peter Gregg
 Hurley Haywood
 Phil Hill
 Al Holbert
 Scott Pruett
 Brian Redman
 Touring cars
 Yvan Muller
 Laurent Aïello
 Fabrizio Giovanardi
 Roberto Ravaglia
 Klaus Ludwig
 Bernd Schneider
 Peter Brock
 José María López
 Ingo Hoffmann

 Team owners, directors, and engineers

 Formula One
 Flavio Briatore
 Ross Brawn
 Colin Chapman
 Gian Paolo Dallara
 Ron Dennis
 Enzo Ferrari
 Gordon Murray
 Tom Walkinshaw
 Frank Williams

 North America
 Richard Childress
 Chip Ganassi
 Carl Haas
 Gene Haas
 Rick Hendrick
 Roger Penske
 Jack Roush

 Executives

 Jean-Marie Balestre
 Bernie Ecclestone
 Bill France Sr.
 Tony George
 Tony Hulman
 Max Mosley
 Jean Todt

Specific auto racing teams and constructors 

 Formula One

 Alfa Romeo
 Brabham
 Cooper Car Company
 Ferrari
 Lotus
 McLaren
 Mercedes
 Red Bull Racing
 Renault
 Williams

 Sports car racing and rallying

 Citroën World Rally Team
 Ford World Rally Team
 Ford Racing
 Joest Racing
 Maserati
 Nismo
 Peugeot Sport
 Renault Sport
 Toyota Motorsport GmbH
 Porsche
 Volkswagen Motorsport

 NASCAR and IndyCar

 All American Racers
 Andretti Autosport
 Chip Ganassi Racing
 Hendrick Motorsports
 Newman/Haas Racing
 Richard Childress Racing
 Roush Fenway Racing
 Team Penske
 Yates Racing

 Customer chassis builders

 Cooper Car Company
 Dallara
 Kurtis Kraft
 Lola Cars
 March Engineering
 Mygale

 Engine builders

 Advanced Engine Research
 Cosworth
 Coventry Climax
 Judd
 Offenhauser

See also 

 Outline of sports

References

External links 

 Sanctioning bodies
 Motor Sports Association (MSA UK)
 American Le Mans Series (ALMS)
 Indy Racing League (IRL)
 World Rally Championship (WRC)
 Fédération Internationale de l'Automobile (FIA)
 Grand American Road Racing Association
 International Hot Rod Association (IHRA)
 International Motor Sports Association (IMSA)
 National Auto Sport Association
 National Association for Stock Car Auto Racing (NASCAR)
 National Hot Rod Association (NHRA)
 SCORE International Off-Road Racing
 Sports Car Club of America (SCCA)
 United States Auto Club (USAC)
 Formula One (F1)
 Confederation of Australian Motorsport (CAMS)

Auto racing
Auto racing